In mathematics, the Riemann–Hurwitz formula, named after Bernhard Riemann and Adolf Hurwitz, describes the relationship of the Euler characteristics of two surfaces when one is a ramified covering of the other. It therefore connects ramification with algebraic topology, in this case. It is a prototype result for many others, and is often applied in the theory of Riemann surfaces (which is its origin) and algebraic curves.

Statement 
For a compact, connected, orientable surface , the Euler characteristic  is

,

In the case of an (unramified) covering map of surfaces

that is surjective and of degree , we have the formula

What the Riemann–Hurwitz formula does is to add in a correction to allow for ramification (sheets coming together).

The map  is said to be ramified at a point P in S′ if there exist analytic coordinates near P and π(P) such that π takes the form π(z) = zn, and n > 1. An equivalent way of thinking about this is that there exists a small neighborhood U of P such that π(P) has exactly one preimage in U, but the image of any other point in U has exactly n preimages in U.  The number n is called the ramification index at P and also denoted by eP. In calculating the Euler characteristic of S′ we notice the loss of eP − 1 copies of P above π(P) (that is, in the inverse image of π(P)). Now let us choose triangulations of S and S′ with vertices at the branch and ramification points, respectively, and use these to compute the Euler characteristics. Then S′ will have the same number of d-dimensional faces for d different from zero, but fewer than expected vertices. Therefore, we find a "corrected" formula

or as it is also commonly written, using that  and multiplying through by -1:

(all but finitely many P have eP = 1, so this is quite safe). This formula is known as the Riemann–Hurwitz formula and also as Hurwitz's theorem.

Another useful form of the formula is:

where r is the number points in S at which the cover has nontrivial ramification (ramification points) 
and b is the number of points in S that are images of such points (branch points).
Then apply the general degree formula to the restriction, use the fact that the Euler characteristic of the disc equals 1,
and use the additivity of the Euler characteristic under connected sums.

 Examples 
The Weierstrass -function, considered as a meromorphic function with values in the Riemann sphere, yields a map from an elliptic curve (genus 1) to the projective line (genus 0). It is a double cover (N = 2), with ramification at four points only, at which e = 2. The Riemann–Hurwitz formula then reads

with the summation taken over four ramification points.

The formula may also be used to calculate the genus of hyperelliptic curves.

As another example, the Riemann sphere maps to itself by the function zn, which has ramification index n at 0, for any integer n > 1. There can only be other ramification at the point at infinity. In order to balance the equation

we must have ramification index n at infinity, also.

 Consequences 
Several results in algebraic topology and complex analysis follow.

Firstly, there are no ramified covering maps from a curve of lower genus to a curve of higher genus – and thus, since non-constant meromorphic maps of curves are ramified covering spaces, there are no non-constant meromorphic maps from a curve of lower genus to a curve of higher genus.

As another example, it shows immediately that a curve of genus 0 has no cover with N > 1 that is unramified everywhere: because that would give rise to an Euler characteristic > 2.

 Generalizations 
For a correspondence of curves, there is a more general formula, Zeuthen's theorem', which gives the ramification correction to the first approximation that the Euler characteristics are in the inverse ratio to the degrees of the correspondence.

An orbifold covering of degree N between orbifold surfaces S' and S is a branched covering, so the Riemann–Hurwitz formula implies the usual formula for coverings

denoting with  the orbifold Euler characteristic.

References
 , section IV.2.

Algebraic topology
Algebraic curves
Riemann surfaces